Olkhovsky (masculine), Olkhovskaya (feminine), or Olkhovskoye (neuter) may refer to:

Places
Olkhovsky District, a district of Volgograd Oblast, Russia
Olkhovsky (inhabited locality) (Olkhovskaya, Olkhovskoye), several inhabited localities in Russia

People
Andrei Olhovskiy (Olkhovsky) (b. 1966), Soviet/Russian tennis player
Ilya Olkhovsky, elected officer of the Ministry of Internal Affairs of the Republic of Khakassia, Russia
Ruslan Olkhovsky, CEO of Softengi, a Ukrainian IT outsourcing service provider
Yuri Olkhovsky (1930–2009), US supporter of the Soviet dissident movement and retired professor of The George Washington University

See also
Olkhovka, several rural localities in Russia